Aristotelia achyrobathra is a moth of the family Gelechiidae. It was described by Edward Meyrick in 1933. It is found in the Democratic Republic of the Congo (Katanga).

References

Moths described in 1933
Aristotelia (moth)
Moths of Africa